Paula Stewart (born Dorothy Paula Zürndorfer, April 9, 1929) is an American stage, film and television actress mostly known for performing in bit parts and supporting roles.

Early years
Stewart's father was Dr. Walter Zürndorfer and her mother, Esther Morris, was an actress. She attended Shimer College in Mount Carroll, Illinois, then a women's junior college, and graduated in 1947. She continued her studies at Northwestern University, and later joined the national touring company of Brigadoon.

Career 
Stewart was signed as understudy to Anne Crowley in a production of Seventeen on Broadway in June 1951.

Stewart starred in the George White revue Nice to See You in 1953 at the Versailles Club, a dinner theatre. In September 1955, Stewart, a soprano, began a month-long engagement with Kismet at the Music circus in Lambertville, New Jersey. She has performed in over 35 musicals and plays on Broadway and in major Summer Stock productions around the country. She co-starred with Donald O'Connor in Little Me, Gordon MacRae and Howard Keel in Carousel, and Jack Carter in Operation Mad Ball, Born Yesterday and Critics Choice from 1956 to 1957. She succeeded Jo Sullivan in The Threepenny Opera, and was subsequently  recruited by Frank Loesser to star in the revival of The Most Happy Fella in 1959.

In 1960, Stewart was a featured player in the revue, From A to Z, starring Hermione Gingold. Later that year she appeared opposite Lucille Ball as her sister in the musical, Wildcat (1960) at the Alvin Theater. In 1961 she was featured  in the Broadway musical Let It Ride starring George Gobel and Sam Levene at the Eugene O'Neill Theatre. In 1965 she succeeded Bernice Massi  in What Makes Sammy Run?.

Paula Stewart and Jack Carter performed together in theatres and nightclubs around the country and overseas for the USO in Germany. In New York City they performed at the prestigious Number One Fifth Avenue, The Versailles Club, The Empire Room at the Waldorf Astoria, The Starlight Room at The Americana Hotel; in Las Vegas at The El Rancho Vegas and The Flamingo; in Lake Tahoe at the Harrah’s Hotel; and The La Ronde Room at The Fountainbleu Hotel and The Deauville, both in Miami, Florida.

Photo model

Stewart did a two-page lingerie layout as a model for Picture Week in May 1956. She also appeared in a number of print ads including an ad for Cashmere Bouquet as well as an ad for Heublein Liquor in which she appeared with her then husband Jack Carter.

Television
She appeared on episodes of Route 66 (1963), The Joey Bishop Show (1964), Hogan's Heroes (1965), Perry Mason (1965), My Favorite Martian (1966), The Big Valley (1966), and Love, American Style (1969). She made a television movie, Without Her Consent, in 1990.

Films
Her first motion picture credit is for the role of Carlotta Jones in Diary of a Bachelor (1964). The independent film about a wealthy woman who discovers the diary of her bachelor fiancé stars William Traylor and Dagne Crane. Other films in which she appeared, albeit in bit parts, include Kemek (1970) and Suppose They Gave a War and Nobody Came? (1970)

Marriages

Paula married Burt Bacharach in 1953 during her run in Nice to See You at the Versailles Club. He was her accompanist and scored arrangements for her night club act. They divorced amicably in 1958. Stewart married comedian Jack Carter in 1961; they divorced in 1970. They have a son, Michael David Carter.

Film producer
In 1970 Stewart produced the movie Dinah East. The film was directed by Gene Nash and starred unknown actors Jeremy Stockwell and Andy Davis, as well as counterculture diva Ultra Violet.

References

External links
Paula Stewart bio/photo
Official Website

1929 births
Living people
Actresses from Chicago
Northwestern University alumni
Shimer College alumni
American stage actresses
American film actresses
Film producers from Illinois
American musical theatre actresses
American television actresses
American women singers
Female models from Illinois
American women film producers
21st-century American women